Operation Skagway was a post-World War II U.S. Navy operation which required clearing the minefields in the East China Sea-Ryukyus area.

Example of Use 

USS Incredible (AM-249)

References 

Non-combat military operations involving the United States
Aftermath of World War II in the United States